The women's team pursuit competition at the 2006 Winter Olympics in Turin, Italy, began on 15 February at Oval Lingotto. The team pursuit consisted of a qualifying round, then a series of elimination races, with the winners of the elimination races progressing to the next round of the 'knockout phase'.

Each race was skated by two teams of three skaters, over a distance of six 400-metre laps (2400 metres total). The three skaters of a team were allowed to change order at any time, but the team's final time was always recorded when the third skater crossed the finishing line. If two teams started simultaneously on opposite sides of the track, and if one team managed to overtake the other before the full distance, the overtaking team was immediately declared the winner.

Records
Prior to this competition, the existing world and Olympic records were as follows.

The following new world and Olympic records were set during this competition.

Results

Teams had to select three skaters for each round of the team pursuit, but all skaters who participated in at least one round earned a medal, and are mentioned in the overall results below.

Heats

Knockout round

Quarterfinals

Semifinals

Finals

Four finals determined the final finishing order, with the two semifinal winners meeting for gold, and the two semifinal losers racing for bronze. To determine places five-through-eight, the four quarterfinal losers were ranked by their time in the quarterfinal race, with the fastest loser matched up against the second-fastest for fifth, and the two slowest for seventh.

Final A (gold medal)

Final B (bronze medal)

Final C (5th place)

Final D (7th place)

References

Women's speed skating at the 2006 Winter Olympics